Basilio Haggiar, BS (born on 6 January 1839 in Gezzin, Syria - died in 1919) was an archbishop of the Melkite Greek Catholic Archeparchy of Bosra and Hauran in Syria and Melkite Greek Catholic Archeparchy of Sidon in Lebanon.

Life

Basil Haggiar was appointed on October 14, 1871 as Bishop of Bosra and Hauran in Syria and was consecrated on 24 October 1871 to the bishopric. With the establishment of the Archeparchy of Bosra and Hauran in 1881, he has been implemented as Archbishop of Bosra and Hauran. In 1887 Haggiar took over the archbishopric of Sidon in Lebanon and died in 1919 after 47 years of episcopal life. His successor in Bosra and Hauran was Archbishop Nicolas Cadi and Atanasio Khoriaty in Sidon.

External links
 http://www.catholic-hierarchy.org/bishop/bhaggb.html
 http://www.gcatholic.org/dioceses/diocese/said0.htm#17548

1839 births
1919 deaths
Melkite Greek Catholic bishops
19th-century Syrian people
20th-century Syrian people
19th-century Eastern Catholic archbishops
20th-century Eastern Catholic archbishops
Syrian Melkite Greek Catholics
Bishops in the Ottoman Empire